Hunter Dickinson (born November 25, 2000) is an American college basketball player for the Michigan Wolverines of the Big Ten Conference. He was named a consensus second-team All-American as a 20 year old freshman in 2021.

High school career

Dickinson attended DeMatha Catholic High School in Hyattsville, Maryland. As a sophomore, he helped his team capture its first Washington Catholic Athletic Conference (WCAC) championship since 2011. Dickinson was named to the First Team All-WCAC alongside teammate Justin Moore. In his junior season, Dickinson averaged 17.6 points, 10.8 rebounds and 2.5 blocks per game. On February 11, 2020, he recorded 40 points, nine rebounds and three blocks in a 71–63 win over St. John's College High School. Despite not making a three-pointer in November and December 2019, Dickinson shot 40 percent from three-point range during his senior year. As a senior, Dickinson averaged 18.1 points, 10.3 rebounds, 3.8 assists and 2.1 blocks per game, leading his team to a WCAC title. 

Dickinson earned All-Met Player of the Year and WCAC Player of the Year honors, and was named Maryland Gatorade Player of the Year for his success in basketball and academics, and his exemplary character. He graduated as a three-time first-team All-WCAC selection. Dickinson was invited to play in the Jordan Brand Classic. He competed for Team Takeover on the Amateur Athletic Union circuit alongside his college teammate, Terrance Williams.

Recruiting
Dickinson was a consensus four-star recruit and ranked as the second-best player from Maryland in the 2020 class. On December 20, 2019, he committed to playing college basketball for Michigan over offers from Duke, Florida State and Notre Dame. He was drawn by his relationship with head coach Juwan Howard and Michigan's strength and conditioning program.

College career

Freshman season

In his debut for Michigan on November 25, 2020, Dickinson scored 11 points and had eight rebounds in a 96–82 win against Bowling Green. Dickinson averaged 13.0 points, 9.0 rebounds and one block per game and shot 73.3 percent from the floor (11-for-15) in wins over Ball State and Central Florida. He also recorded his first career double-double with 12 points and a career-high 11 rebounds in the Wolverines' 84–65 win against Ball State. Following his outstanding performance, he was named the Big Ten Freshman of the Week for the week of December 7. Dickinson averaged 19.0 points, 7.0 rebounds and 3.5 blocked shots per game in wins over Toledo and Penn State, and was named the Big Ten Freshman of the Week for the week of December 14 for the second consecutive week. On December 25, Dickinson recorded 13 points and a career-high 15 rebounds, for his second career double-double, in an 80–69 victory against Nebraska. He was subsequently named the Big Ten Freshman of the Week for the week of December 28. On December 31, Dickinson recorded a career-high 26 points and 11 rebounds, for his third career double-double in an 84–73 victory against Maryland. Dickinson averaged 22.5 points and 7.0 rebounds in wins over Maryland and then-ranked No. 19/No. 22 Northwestern to help the Wolverines improve to 9–0 on the season. He finished the week shooting 18-for-23 from the field (.782 pct.) and 9-of-12 from the foul line (.750 pct.) for an overall shooting percentage of 78, and was named the Big Ten Freshman of the Week for the week of January 4, 2021, his fourth Freshman of the Week accolade of his career. 

Dickinson led Michigan in scoring (14.1), rebounding (7.4), double-doubles (5) and 10+ rebounding games (5). He helped Michigan extend its list to three straight years with a player on the All-Freshman team, joining Ignas Brazdeikis (2019) and Franz Wagner (2020). Following an outstanding season, Dickinson was named first-team All-Big Ten by the media, second=team All-Big Ten by the coaches, a Big Ten All-Freshman honoree and the Big Ten Conference Freshman of the Year. He was also named a consensus second team All-American, becoming Michigan's first consensus All-American since Nik Stauskas in 2014 and 13th all time.

Sophomore season
As a sophomore, Dickinson was named to the Second Team All-Big Ten by both the coaches and the media as well as the All-Defensive Team.

Junior season
On November 8, 2022, in a 75–56 victory over Purdue Fort Wayne, Dickinson recorded a game-high 22 points and 12 rebounds, for his 18th career double-double. Dickinson reached 1,000 career points on a free throw with 3:43 remaining in the first half, becoming the 57th Wolverine to reach the milestone. On November 16, in a 91–60 victory over Pittsburgh in the semifinals of the Legends Classic, Dickinson recorded 11 points and seven rebounds. With seven rebounds, Dickinson became the 46th Wolverine to reach the 500 rebounds milestone. After reaching 1,000 points in the season-opener against Purdue Fort Wayne, he became the 31st member of Michigan's 1,000 point/500 rebound club. On February 26, Dickinson scored a buzzer-beating three-point shot to force overtime in an 87–79 victory over Wisconsin. On March 2, Dickinson scored 31 points in an 87–91 double-overtime loss to Illinois, becoming the 22nd Wolverine to reach the 1,500 point milestone. With his 31 points, Dickinson surpassed current head coach Juwan Howard (1,526) for 20th on Michigan's all-time scoring list. On March 5, Dickinson scored 24 points and 14 rebounds in a 73–75 overtime loss to Indiana. With 14 rebounds, Dickinson became the ninth Wolverine to surpass the 750-rebound mark, and the sixth Wolverine to reach 1,500 points and 750 rebounds. Following the regular season, he earned All-Big Ten 1st team recognition from the media and 2nd team recognition from the coaches. He was an Associated Press honorable mention 2023 NCAA Men's Basketball All-Americans. On March 18, during the second round of the 2023 National Invitation Tournament, Dickinson recorded 21 points and 11 rebounds, for his 31st career double-double. With his double-double Dickinson tied Loy Vaught for sixth most all-time in Michigan program history.

Career statistics

College

|-
| style="text-align:left;"| 2020–21
| style="text-align:left;"| Michigan
| 28 || 23 || 26.0 || .598 || .000 || .739 || 7.4 || .9 || .3 || 1.4 || 14.1
|-
| style="text-align:left;"| 2021–22
| style="text-align:left;"| Michigan
| 32 || 32 || 32.3 || .563 || .328 || .802 || 8.6 || 2.3 || .5 || 1.5 || 18.6

Personal life
Dickinson's parents are originally from Buffalo, New York. His mother, Kathy, played volleyball for Niagara. He is an avid Buffalo Bills fan.

References

External links
Michigan Wolverines bio

2000 births
Living people
All-American college men's basketball players
American men's basketball players
Barstool Sports people
Basketball players from Virginia
Centers (basketball)
DeMatha Catholic High School alumni
Michigan Wolverines men's basketball players
Sportspeople from Alexandria, Virginia